The ADL class is a class of diesel multiple units that were last operated by Auckland One Rail on the suburban rail network in Auckland, New Zealand. Originally built in the early 1980s by A Goninan & Co for Westrail of Western Australia, they were sold in 1993 by Westrail's successor, Transperth, to New Zealand Rail. The units are currently owned by Auckland Transport, and were withdrawn from service in August 2022 and transported to Glenbrook Vintage Railway and its Pukeoware depot for storage.

History

Between 1982 and 1985, ten two-carriage stainless steel sets were manufactured for Transperth by A Goninan & Co, Newcastle.

Following the electrification of the Perth rail network they were rendered surplus and in 1993 all were sold, along with the older ADK/ADB class, to New Zealand Rail to replace locomotive-hauled 56-foot carriages on suburban trains in Auckland. 

The units arrived in Auckland from Perth in April 1993. One unit went to Hutt Workshops in the winter of 1993 for staff familiarisation, while the other units were prepared for New Zealand service at Westfield locomotive depot.

As a result of the units’ introduction, station platforms in Auckland needed to be raised. 

In October 1993, prior to New Zealand Rail being privatised, the company sold the class to the Auckland Regional Council.

Upgrades and retirement 
In 2002, the Auckland Regional Council funded an upgrade of the class, which included refurbishment of the interiors and painting in the new MAXX blue colour scheme. The first refurbished unit entered service in December 2002, the last in November 2003.

In 2011, Auckland Transport indicated four two-car sets would be retained after the Auckland rail electrification project is completed. 

Due to the introduction of the AM class electric multiple unit on all of Auckland's suburban railway lines, the ADL/ADC units were retained only for use between Pukekohe and Papakura station as a shuttle service. The diesel units were also used to provide service during power outages when electric trains could not operate.  

This is due to that portion of the North Island Main Trunk not currently being electrified. In 2020, the government announced funding for electrification of this section, which once completed will render the ADL/ADC DMUs surplus to requirements. The ADL class were retired in August 2022.

Two out of service ADLs were transferred to Glenbrook Vintage Railway (GVR) for storage in 2021 to make space for new EMUs. The DMUs were hauled to GVR by the railway's own DBR1254, because KiwiRail were unable to provide motive power for the transfers. The ADLs are now stored at Glenbrook Vintage Railway and Pukeoware depot.

References

Citations

Bibliography

  (First edition 1990, 1991)

External links
 ADL class Auckland 1993 – New Zealand Railways Rollingstock List

Diesel multiple units of New Zealand
Diesel multiple units of Western Australia